Akbar Babakhanlou (born 4 August 1939) is an Iranian sprinter. He competed in the men's 100 metres at the 1964 Summer Olympics.

References

1939 births
Living people
Athletes (track and field) at the 1964 Summer Olympics
Iranian male sprinters
Olympic athletes of Iran
Place of birth missing (living people)